Mark Andrew Devlin (born 18 January 1973) is a Scottish former footballer, who played in the Football League for Exeter City and Stoke City.

Career
Born in Irvine, Devlin played football as a youngster with the Kilmarnock Boy's Club.
He joined Stoke City in 1990 and played in 21 matches during the 1990–91 season where he scored 2 goals. He spent the next four seasons with the reserves and re-appeared for the first team in the 1995–96 and 1996–97 seasons.

After struggling to make an impact at the club, after seven years he left for Exeter City and finished his career playing for Northwich Victoria where he made 223 appearances. He made the second highest number of football league appearances for the non-league outfit.

Career statistics
Source:

A.  The "Other" column constitutes appearances and goals in the Anglo-Italian Cup and the Football League Trophy.

References

External links
 

Scottish footballers
Stoke City F.C. players
Exeter City F.C. players
Northwich Victoria F.C. players
English Football League players
1973 births
Living people
Association football midfielders
National League (English football) players